The Majority Floor Leader of the House of Representatives of the Philippines, or simply the House Majority Floor Leader, is the leader elected by the majority bloc of the House of Representatives of the Philippines that serves as their official leader in the body. He also manages the business of the majority part in the House of Representatives. By tradition, the Speaker or any Presiding Officer gives the Majority leader priority in obtaining the floor and also, he is the traditional Chairman of the Committee on Rules.

List of majority floor leaders

See also 
 Minority Floor Leader of the House of Representatives of the Philippines

External links
 House of Representatives of the Philippines

References